The 2010 FC Zenit Saint Petersburg season was the 15th straight season that the club will play in the Russian Premier League, the highest tier of football in Russia. The club won the Russian Premier League for the second time in four years and the Russian Cup for the first time since 1999, completing a double.

Internationally, the club was registered for Europe's highest level of football competition, the 2010–11 UEFA Champions League, as the third place team from Russia in 2009. Zenit were drawn into the Group Stage of the 2010–11 UEFA Europa League alongside Anderlecht, AEK Athens and Hajduk after falling 2–1 on aggregate to French club Auxerre in the Champions League play-off round.

Season Events
 11 January: Defender Michael Lumb signs for Zenit from AGF Aarhus.
 16 January: Striker Aleksandr Kerzhakov returns to Zenit from Dynamo Moscow after spending six seasons with the club from 2001-06.
 26 January: Defender Kim Dong-jin's contract is terminated due to medical examinations and fainting bouts experienced during practices with the South Korea national team.
 28 January: Zenit plays its first match of 2010, a friendly against Uzbek side Lokomotiv Tashkent during training camp in Dubai, United Arab Emirates.
 29 January: Midfielder Igor Semshov rejoins Dynamo Moscow on a three-year contract for an undisclosed fee.
 3 February: Striker and club leading goal scorer from 2008 and 2009 Fatih Tekke joins Rubin Kazan on a three-year contract for an undisclosed fee.
 23 February: Goalkeeper Yuri Zhevnov signs for Zenit from FC Moscow.
 3 March: Striker Danko Lazović signs for Zenit from PSV.
 9 March: Striker Sergey Kornilenko joins former club Tom Tomsk on a one-year loan deal with the option to return to Zenit during the summer.
 13 March: Midfielder Danny plays his first match in ten months after suffering a season-ending injury in May 2009 and scores the winning goal against Krylia Sovetov.
 16 May: Zenit wins the Russian Cup 1–0 over Sibir Novosibirsk, with the Cup-winning goal scored by midfielder Roman Shirokov.
 5 July: Defender Nicolas Lombaerts signs a new four-year contract with the club.
 19 July: Striker Aleksandr Bukharov signs for Zenit from Rubin Kazan. Newly acquired defender Michael Lumb is loaned to Feyenoord until July 2011 due to lack of playing time with the club.
 29 July: Midfielder Igor Denisov signs a new five-year contract with the club and defender Aleksandar Luković signs for Zenit from Udinese.
 31 July: Zenit wins its ninth-straight Russian Premier League match after defeating reigning champions Rubin Kazan 2–0 on a double from striker Aleksandr Kerzhakov. Defender Sébastien Puygrenier returns from a year loan at Monaco and attends Zenit's summer camp in Austria before receiving another one-year loan deal with Monaco.
 3 August: Defender Bruno Alves signs for Zenit from Porto for a Russian Premier League-record €22 million foreign transfer fee.
 4 August: Zenit defeats Unirea Urziceni 1–0 on aggregate to advance to the play-off round of the 2010–11 UEFA Champions League. Danny scores the only goal of the tie in the 33rd minute of the second leg, assisted by Vladimir Bystrov.
 5 August: Midfielder Sergei Semak signs for Zenit from Rubin Kazan.
 25 August: Manager Luciano Spalletti suffers his first competitive loss with Zenit, falling 2–0 to French club Auxerre at the Stade de l'Abbé-Deschamps. Zenit sees both goalkeeper Vyacheslav Malafeev and defender Tomáš Hubočan sent off by Slovenian referee Damir Skomina as the club falls out of the Champions League 2–1 on aggregate.
 27 August: Zenit are seeded into Pot No. 1 of the Europa League with a UEFA coefficient of 61.258 and drawn into a group with Anderlecht, AEK Athens and Hajduk Split.
 7 September: Zenit release midfielder Radek Šírl.
 14 November: Zenit win the 2010 Russian Premier League by defeating Rostov at the Petrovsky Stadium 5–0.
 9 December: 10 Zenit players are named to the annual RFU Top 33 Best Players list with seven players – Aleksandr Anyukov (right back), Tomáš Hubočan (left back), Igor Denisov (defensive midfield), Vladimir Bystrov (right midfield), Konstantin Zyryanov (central midfield), Danny (left midfield) and Aleksandr Kerzhakov (right forward) – named the best at their respective position.
 19 December: Four Zenit players receive trophies at the RFU's award ceremony in Moscow. Aleksandr Kerzhakov was named Striker of the Year, Danny was named the best foreign player, manager Luciano Spalletti was named Coach of the Year, and captain Aleksandr Anyukov was named Most Valuable Player.

Squad

Transfers

In

Out

Loans out

Released

Friendlies
Winter

Summer

Competitions

Russian Premier League

Results summary

Results by matchday

Results

League table

Russian Cup

The Round of 16 match against Anzhi Makhachkala took place during the 2011–12 season.

UEFA Champions League

Qualifying rounds

UEFA Europa League

Group stage

The Round of 32 match against Young Boys took place during the 2011–12 season.

Squad statistics

Appearances and goals

|-
|colspan="16"|Players away from the club on loan:

|-
|colspan="16"|Players who left Zenit St.Petersburg during the season:
|}

Goal scorers

References

External links
 Information from http://www.rfpl.org/
 2010 Zenit Saint Petersburg season at ESPN
 Zenit Saint Petersburg statistics at sports.ru

2010
Zenit Saint Petersburg
Russian football championship-winning seasons
Zenit Saint Petersburg